Thiamin pyrophosphokinase 1 is an enzyme that in humans is encoded by the TPK1 gene.

This gene encodes a protein, that exists as a homodimer, which catalyzes the conversion of thiamine to thiamine pyrophosphate. Alternate transcriptional splice variants, encoding different isoforms, have been characterized.

References

Further reading

EC 2.7.11